The Ireland cricket team toured Kenya in February 2012. They played an Intercontinental Cup match, two Intercontinental Cup ODIs and two Twenty20 Internationals against Kenya.

Background
In early January 2012, it was reported at Ireland's tour to Kenya was in doubt due to security concerns at their Mombasa venue. These concerns arose with Mombasa being just 150 miles from the volatile Somali border, where recent high-profile kidnappings and attacks have taken place.  Cricket Ireland, liaising with the International Cricket Council, requested that the matches held at Mombasa be moved if their players security could not be guaranteed. However Cricket Kenya drew up sufficient security plans to allow the matches to take place at Mombasa.

Squads

Intercontinental Cup Match

ODI Series

1st ODI

2nd ODI

Twenty20 Series

1st T20I

2nd T20I

3rd T20I

References

Ireland 2011-12
2012 in cricket
Irish cricket tours abroad
2012 in Kenyan cricket